Narathu (1118–1171) was king of Pagan dynasty of Burma (Myanmar) from 1167 to 1171. Narahthu ascended the throne after murdering his father King Alaungsithu and his elder brother Min Shin Saw. Narathu built the largest of all the Pagan temples, the Dhammayangyi. Nonetheless, his conduct greatly lowered the prestige of the dynasty, and he was deeply disfavored. The king was assassinated by the mercenaries sent by the chief of Pateikkaya in 1171.

Early life
Narathu was a middle son of King Sithu I and Queen Yadanabon. His mother was a daughter of Dhamma Kyin, a minister at King Kyansittha's court. The chronicles do not agree on the dates regarding his life and reign. The table below lists the dates given by the four main chronicles.

Narathu was a senior prince for much of his father's reign, whereas the king's eldest son Min Shin Saw was the heir apparent. However, Min Shin Saw had a major falling out with his father, and was sent to exile at Aung Pinle Lake (near present-day Mandalay). With Min Shin Saw in exile, Narathu now positioned himself to take over the throne. He impressed his father with his management of day-to-day affairs of the kingdom. He soon became the de facto heir apparent at the court.

Accession
In 1167, Sithu fell violently ill, and Narathu ordered the king moved to the Shwegugyi Temple, which Sithu had built in 1131. According to the chronicles, when the king woke up and realized that he had been moved out of the palace, he was furious. Narathu came into the room, and put a blanket over his bedridden father's head.

He still needed to deal with Min Shin Saw, who had come down with an army to claim the throne. Narathu readily submitted, personally leading Min Shin Saw's coronation ceremony. After the ceremony, Min Shin Saw was poisoned while eating his first meal as king.

Reign
Narathu's conduct lowered the prestige of the empire, and he was deeply unpopular. Burdened by his guilt, he shut himself in his palace. To atone for the sins, he built the largest of all the Pagan temples, the Dhammayangyi.

It is said that Narathu does not use water after going to the toilet and because of this the Pateikkaya queen did not let him come near her. Narathu became angry. However, the new king could not control his violent temper, and killed a queen of his with his bare hands in one of his episodes of violence. The queen was a daughter of chief of Pateikkaya, a tributary kingdom in the west in Bengal or near present-day Chin State.

Death

Assassination by Pateikkaya
The chief of Pateikkaya, angered by Narathu's action, sent a group of eight assassins, disguised as Brahmin astrologers in 1171. The eight managed to gain an audience with the king while hiding their swords underneath their robes. They quickly fell the king. When the palace guards rushed in, they all committed suicide.

Assassination by Polonnaruwa
According to a theory proposed by Gordon Luce, Narathu may have been killed by the assassins from Kingdom of Polonnaruwa in 1165. His theory has been strongly refuted by Htin Aung as pure conjecture.

However, some inscriptions in Burma supported this theory, along with the Culawamsa of Sri Lanka.

References

Bibliography
 
 
 
 
 
 
 

Pagan dynasty
1118 births
1171 deaths
12th-century Burmese monarchs